The 2007–08 Bulgarian Hockey League season was the 56th season of the Bulgarian Hockey League, the top level of ice hockey in Bulgaria. Four teams participated in Group A of the league, and HK Slavia Sofia won the championship. Group B also consisted of four teams, and was won by Ledenite Dyavoli Sofia.

Standings

Group A

Group B

External links
 Season on hockeyarchives.info

Bulgar
Bulgarian Hockey League seasons
Bulg